Chiricahua National Forest was established as the Chiricahua Forest Reserve in Cochise County, Arizona by the General Land Office on July 1, 1902, with .  After the transfer of federal forests to the U.S. Forest Service in 1905, it became a national forest on March 4, 1907. On July 1, 1908, it absorbed Peloncillo National Forest, including lands in Hidalgo County, New Mexico. On July 1, 1917, Chiricahua was absorbed by Coronado National Forest and the name was discontinued.

The forest included part of the Chiricahua Mountains, one of the Madrean Sky Islands. A portion of the national forest lands were transferred to the National Park Service with the establishment of Chiricahua National Monument in 1924. The remaining lands are presently administered by the Douglas Ranger District of Coronado.

References

External links
Coronado National Forest
Chiricahua National Monument
Forest History Society
Listing of the National Forests of the United States and Their Dates (from Forest History Society website) Text from Davis, Richard C., ed. Encyclopedia of American Forest and Conservation History. New York: Macmillan Publishing Company for the Forest History Society, 1983. Vol. II, pp. 743-788.

Chiricahua Mountains
Former National Forests of Arizona
Former National Forests of New Mexico
Coronado National Forest
Protected areas of Hidalgo County, New Mexico
Protected areas of Cochise County, Arizona
1902 establishments in Arizona Territory
1917 disestablishments in Arizona
1917 disestablishments in New Mexico
Protected areas established in 1902
Protected areas disestablished in 1917